SAARC Literary Award is an annual award conferred by the Foundation of SAARC Writers and Literature (FOSWAL) since 2001 Shamshur Rahman, Mahasweta Devi, Jayanta Mahapatra,  Abhi Subedi, Mark Tully, Sitakant Mahapatra, Uday Prakash, Suman Pokhrel, and Abhay K have been some of the recipients of this award. 
Nepali poet, lyricist, and translator Suman Pokhrel is only writer to have been given this award twice.

Award Recipients

The year wise list of the award recipients are as follows:

 

FOSWAL also confers "SAARC Young Writers Award" to the emerging poets and writers from South Asian countries. Khalida Froagh, Rubana Huq, Vivimarie Vanderpoorten, Nanda Tint Swe, Manu Manjil, Nayyara Rahman are some of its recipients.

References

External links
Foundation of SAARC Writers and Literature
FOSWAL Advisory Committee
Related News on OneIndia
Related News on Hindustan Times
Related News on NDTV
Related News on Afgan Embassy
Related News on The Kathmandu Post
Related News on Outlook India
Related News on Greater Kashmir

Asian literary awards
Poetry awards
Awards established in 2001
Literary Award